Dicentra eximia (wild or fringed bleeding-heart, turkey-corn) is a flowering plant with fernlike leaves and oddly shaped flowers native to the Appalachian Mountains. It is similar to the Pacific bleeding-heart (Dicentra formosa), which grows on the Pacific Coast. Dicentra eximia is a perennial herb in the Papaveraceae family.

Description
Leaves are finely divided and gray-green, growing from the base of the plant.

Flowers are pink and bloom in tight clusters at the top of leafless, fleshy stems above the leaves from mid-spring to autumn. The four petals are connected at the base. The two outer petals are pouched at the base and bent back at the tips. The inner petals are perpendicular to the outer petals and connected at the tip. The pistil is enclosed within the inner petals, and the two stamens are on either side. There are two tiny, triangular, pink sepals above the petals.

Seeds are borne in a plump, pointed pod. They ripen to black while the pod is still green. Each has a white elaiosome prized by ants.

Pacific bleeding-heart (Dicentra formosa) is frequently confused with and sold as Dicentra eximia. It has wider, more rounded flowers with shorter wings on the outer petals (see the photo below).

Ecology
Fringed bleeding-heart is native to the Appalachians from southwestern Pennsylvania south to Tennessee and North Carolina. It is known as a pollinator plant that attracts hummingbirds and bees.

Cultivars
There are several cultivars of Dicentra eximia. Some are hybrids with Dicentra peregrina and Dicentra formosa.

Dicentra eximia
Dicentra eximia 'Alba' — white flowers
Dicentra eximia 'Snowdrift' — larger white flowers

Hybrids
Dicentra 'Bountiful' — Dicentra formosa subsp. oregana × Dicentra eximia — rosy red flowers
Dicentra 'King of Hearts' — Dicentra peregrina × (Dicentra formosa subsp. oregana × Dicentra eximia) — pink flowers, very finely cut leaves
Dicentra 'Luxuriant' — Dicentra eximia × Dicentra peregrina — cherry-red flowers
Dicentra 'Silversmith — Dicentra formosa subsp. oregana × Dicentra eximia — white, pink-flushed flowers
Dicentra 'Stuart Boothman' — probably Dicentra formosa subsp. oregana × Dicentra eximia — deep pink flowers

References

External links

Flora of North America: Dicentra eximia — map
Native Plant Identification Network
PlantFinder — Kemper Center for Home Gardening, Missouri Botanical Garden

eximia
Flora of the Southeastern United States
Flora of the Appalachian Mountains
Garden plants of North America